"Heartbeat Song" is the first single to be taken from the fourth album from The Futureheads, The Chaos. It was released in the United Kingdom on 12 April 2010 and has so far managed to reach a peak of #34 on the UK Singles Chart. The single peaked on BBC Radio 1's A-list playlist during March 2010.

A limited edition signed and hand-stamped 7" vinyl single was released later that same week for UK Record Store Day. It was limited to 500 copies.

Formats and track listings

Digital Download

iTunes Digital Download

Limited Edition 7" Vinyl

Chart performance

"Heartbeat Song" debuted on the UK Singles Chart on 18 April 2010, where it entered the top 40 at the single's current peak of #34. The following week the single fell 15 places to #49 and on its third week in the chart, it fell a further 41 places to #90.

The single debuted at number one on the UK Indie Chart, where it spent two weeks before dropping to number three.

Critical response

Writing on Time Out New York Volume blog, Noah Tarnow described "Heartbeat Song" as "possibly the greatest tune of the past million years."

Release history

References

The Futureheads songs
2010 singles
Record Store Day releases
2010 songs
Songs written by Ross Millard